

Events

January–March 
 January 11 – Hong Xiuquan officially begins the Taiping Rebellion.
 January 15 – Christian Female College, modern-day Columbia College, receives its charter from the Missouri General Assembly.
 January 23 – The flip of a coin, subsequently named Portland Penny, determines whether a new city in the Oregon Territory is named after Boston, Massachusetts, or Portland, Maine, with Portland winning.
 January 28 – Northwestern University is founded in Illinois.
 February 1 – Brandtaucher, the oldest surviving submersible craft, sinks during acceptance trials in the German port of Kiel, but the designer, Wilhelm Bauer, and the two crew escape successfully.
 February 6 – Black Thursday in Australia: Bushfires sweep across the state of Victoria, burning about a quarter of its area.
 February 12 – Edward Hargraves claims to have found gold in Australia.
 February 15 – In Boston, Massachusetts, members of the anti-slavery Boston Vigilance Committee rescue fugitive slave Shadrach Minkins from a courtroom, following his arrest by U.S. marshals.
 March 1 – Victor Hugo uses the phrase United States of Europe, in a speech to the French National Assembly.
 March 11 – Giuseppe Verdi's opera Rigoletto is first performed at La Fenice in Venice.
 March 27 – The first European men reportedly see Yosemite Valley.
 March 30 – A population census is taken in the United Kingdom. The population reaches 21 million. 6.3 million live in cities of 20,000 or more in England and Wales, and cities of 20,000 or more account for 35% of the total English population.

April–June 
 April 8 – Western Union is founded, as the New York and Mississippi Valley Printing Telegraph Company. 
 April 9 – San Luis, the oldest permanent settlement in the state of Colorado, is founded by settlers from Taos, New Mexico.
 April 20 – Ramón Castilla loses power in Peru.
 April 23 – Anne Darwin, daughter of Charles Darwin dies, sending him into a great depression. 
 April 28 – Santa Clara College is chartered in Santa Clara, California.
 May 1 – The Great Exhibition of the Works of Industry of All Nations in the Crystal Palace, Hyde Park, London is opened by Queen Victoria (it runs until October 15).
 May 15 – The first Australian gold rush is proclaimed, although the discovery had been made three months earlier.
 Alpha Delta Pi sorority, the first secret society for women, is founded at Wesleyan College in Macon, Georgia (U.S.)
 Mongkut (Rama IV) is crowned King of Siam, at the Grand Palace in Bangkok.
 Mid-May to mid-July – Great Flood of 1851: Extensive flooding sweeps across the Midwestern United States. The town of Des Moines is virtually washed away, and many rainfall records hold for 160 years.
 June 2
 Maine passes the first state-wide prohibition law in the United States.
 Castle & Cooke, the predecessor of Dole Food Company, is founded in Hawaii.
 June 21 – The Immortal Game, a famous chess match, is played between Adolf Anderssen and Lionel Kieseritzky, during a break in the first international tournament, held in London.

July–September 
 July 1
 Port Phillip District separates from New South Wales to become the  Colony of Victoria (Australia).
 Serial poisoner Hélène Jégado is arrested in Rennes, France.
 July 10 – The University of the Pacific is chartered as California Wesleyan College, in Santa Clara, California.
 July 28 – Total solar eclipse visible in Canada, Greenland, Iceland and Northern Europe, the first solar eclipse to be photographed.
 July 29 –  Annibale de Gasparis, in Naples, Italy discovers asteroid 15 Eunomia.
 August 1 – Virginia closes its Reform Constitutional Convention, deciding that all white men have the right to vote.
 August 3 – The  filibustering Lopez Expedition sails from New Orleans, Louisiana heading to seize Spanish-ruled Cuba.
 August 12 – Isaac Singer is granted a United States patent for his improved sewing machine.
 August 22 – The yacht America wins the first America's Cup race, off the coast of England.
 September 1 – Narciso López was executed in Havana following the failure of his expedition in Cuba.
 September 15 – Saint Joseph's University is founded in Philadelphia.
 September 18 – The New York Times is founded in New York City. 
 September 30 – HSwMS Eugenie leaves from Karlskrona, Sweden to begin its voyage as the first Swedish Royal Navy vessel to circumnavigate the world.

October–December 
 October – The Reuters news service is founded in London.
 October 15 
 The City of Winona, Minnesota is founded.
 The Great Exhibition in London is closed.
 October 24 – Ariel and Umbriel, moons of Uranus, are discovered by William Lassell.
 November 1 – Saint Petersburg–Moscow Railway officially opened in Russia.
 November 13
 The Denny Party lands at Alki Point, the first settlers of what later becomes Seattle.
 The first protected submarine telegraph cable is laid, across the English Channel.
 November 14 – Herman Melville's novel Moby-Dick; or The Whale is published in the U.S. by Harper & Brothers, New York, after being first published on October 18 in London, by Richard Bentley, in three volumes as The Whale.
 November 21 – Mutineers take control of the Chilean penal colony of Punta Arenas in the Strait of Magellan.
 November 26–27 – Bombardment of Salé, Morocco: French naval forces bombard the city, in retaliation for looting of a French cargo ship.
 December 2 – French coup of 1851: In what amounts to a coup, President Louis-Napoleon Bonaparte of France dissolves the French National Assembly, and declares a new constitution to extend his term. A year later he declares himself as Emperor Napoleon III, ending the Second Republic.
 December 6 – The trial of Hélène Jégado begins in France; she is eventually sentenced to death and executed by guillotine.
 December 9 – The first YMCA in North America is established in Montreal.
 December 22 – India's first freight train is operated in Roorkee, India.
 December 24 – The Library of Congress in Washington, D.C., burns.
 December 26–27 – A Royal Navy warship bombards Lagos Island; Oba Kosoko is wounded, and flees to Epe.
 December 29 – The first YMCA in the United States opens in Boston, Massachusetts.
 December 31 – 1851 Chilean Revolution – Battle of Loncomilla: The rebels are defeated, ending the revolution.

Births

January–June 

 January 9 – Rudolf von Brudermann, Austro-Hungarian general (d. 1941)
 January 16 – William Hall-Jones, English-New Zealand politician, 16th Prime Minister of New Zealand (d. 1936)
 January 17 – A. B. Frost, American illustrator (d. 1928)
 January 19
David Starr Jordan, American ichthyologist, educator, eugenicist, and peace activist (d. 1931)
Jacobus Kapteyn, Dutch astronomer (d. 1922)
 January 21 – Pietro Frugoni, Italian general (d. 1940)
 February 2 – Ella Giles Ruddy, American author and essayist (d. 1917)
 February 13 – Joseph B. Murdock, United States Navy admiral, New Hampshire politician (d. 1931)
 February 15 – Antero Rubín, Spanish general, politician (d. 1935)
 February 23 – Frederick Warde, English actor (d. 1935)
 March 14 – John Sebastian Little, American politician, congressman (d. 1916)
 March 18 
 Rose Coghlan, English actress (d. 1932)
 Julien Dupré, French artist (d. 1910)
 March 19
Pierre Ruffey, French general (d. 1928)
William Henry Stark, American business leader (d. 1936)
 March 24 – Friedrich von Scholtz, German general (d. 1927)
 March 27 – Vincent d'Indy, French composer, teacher (d. 1931)
 March 28 – Bernardino Machado, Portuguese President (d. 1944)
 March 31 – Francis Bell, 20th Prime Minister of New Zealand (d. 1936)
 April 1 – Bruno von Mudra, German general (d. 1931)
 April 4 – James Campbell, 1st Baron Glenavy, Irish lawyer, politician (d. 1931)
 April 13
 Robert Abbe, American surgeon (d. 1928)
 Helen M. Winslow, American editor, author, and publisher (d. 1938)
 April 15 – Auguste Dubail, French general (d. 1934)
 April 20 – Young Tom Morris, Scottish golfer (d. 1875)
 April 21 – Charles Barrois, French geologist (d. 1939)
 May 6 – Aristide Bruant, French cabaret singer, comedian  (d. 1925)
 May 7 – Adolf von Harnack, German Lutheran theologian, church historian (d. 1930)
 May 11 – Madre Teresa Nuzzo, Maltese nun, foundress of the Daughters of the Sacred Heart (d. 1923)
 May 14 – Anna Laurens Dawes, American author, suffragist (d. 1938)
 May 15 – Lillian Resler Keister Harford, American church organizer, editor (d. 1935)

 May 18 – Simon Kahquados, Potawatomi political activist (d. 1930)
 May 20 – Emile Berliner, German-born American telephone and recording pioneer (d. 1929)
 May 21 – Léon Bourgeois, French statesman, recipient of the Nobel Peace Prize (d. 1925)
 June 7 – Ture Malmgren, Swedish journalist, politician (d. 1922)
 June 12 – Sir Oliver Lodge, British physicist (d. 1940)
 June 13 – Anton Haus, Austro-Hungarian admiral (d. 1917)
 June 16 – Georg Jellinek, Austrian legal philosopher (d. 1911)

July–December 

 July 5 – Hannibal di Francia, Italian priest, saint (d. 1927)
 July 8 – Arthur Evans, British archaeologist (d. 1941)
 July 15 – Eduardo Gutiérrez, Argentinian author (d. 1889)
 July 20 – Arnold Pick, Czechoslovakian neurologist, psychiatrist (d. 1924)
 July 21 – Sam Bass, American outlaw (d. 1878)
 August 3 – Nikolai Iudovich Ivanov, Russian general (d. 1919)
 August 14 – Doc Holliday, American gambler, gunfighter (d. 1887)
 September 1 – Carl Kellner, Austrian mystic (d. 1905)
 September 7 – David King Udall, American politician (d. 1938)
 September 13 – Walter Reed, American army physician, bacteriologist (d. 1902)
 September 21 – Arthur Schuster, German-British physicist (d. 1934)
 September 29 – Hardwicke Rawnsley, English clergyman, poet, writer of hymns and conservationist (d. 1920)
 October 2 – Ferdinand Foch, French commander of Allied forces in World War I (d. 1929)
 October 5  – Thomas Pollock Anshutz, American painter, educator (d. 1912) 
 October 20 – George Gandy, American entrepreneur (d. 1946)
 November 5 – Charles Dupuy, 3-time prime minister of France (d. 1923)
 November 10 – José Maria de Yermo y Parres, Mexican Roman Catholic priest and saint (d. 1904)
 November 13 – Klemens Bachleda, Polish Tatra guide and mountain rescuer (d. 1910)
 November 16 – William Elbridge Sewell, American naval officer, Governor of Guam (d. 1904)
 November 27 – Friedrich Sixt von Armin, German general (d. 1936)
 December 10 – Melvil Dewey, American librarian, inventor of Dewey Decimal Classification (d. 1931)
 December 20 – Dora Montefiore, English suffragist, socialist (d. 1933)
 December 24 – Noël Édouard, vicomte de Curières de Castelnau, French general (d. 1944)
 December 30 – Asa Griggs Candler, American businessman, politician (d. 1929)

Date unknown
 Stefania Wolicka, Polish historian

Deaths

January–June 

 January 10 – Karl Freiherr von Müffling, Prussian field marshal (b. 1775)
 January 19 – Esteban Echeverría, Argentine poet, writer (b. 1805)
 January 21 – Albert Lortzing, German composer (b. 1801)
 January 23 – Archibald Primrose, Lord Dalmeny, Scottish politician (b. 1809)
 January 27 – John James Audubon, French-American naturalist, illustrator (b. 1785)
 January 31 – David Spangler Kaufman, Congressman from Texas (b. 1813)
 February 1 – Mary Shelley, English author (b. 1797)
 February 3 – Benjamin Williams Crowninshield, Congressman from Massachusetts, secretary of U.S. Navy (b. 1772)
 February 18 – Carl Gustav Jacob Jacobi, German mathematician (b. 1804)
 February 23 – Joanna Baillie, Scottish poet, dramatist (b. 1762)
 February 28 – Guillaume Dode de la Brunerie, Marshal of France (b. 1775)
 March 4 - Henry Smith, Texas governor (b. 1788)
 March 9 – Hans Christian Ørsted, Danish scientist (b. 1777)
 April 2 – Nangklao (Rama III), King of Siam (Thailand) (b. 1788)
 April 15 – Andrés Quintana Roo, Mexican politician and lawyer, husband of Leona Vicario (b. 1787)
 April 25 – Mor Sæther, Norwegian herbalist (b. 1793)
 May 13 – Princess Augusta of Bavaria, Duchess of Leuchtenberg (b. 1788)
 May 14 – Manuel Gómez Pedraza, 6th President of Mexico, 1832-1833 (b. 1789)
 May 22 – Mordecai Manuel Noah, American writer, journalist (b. 1785)
 June 9 – John Brown Russwurm, Americo-Liberian journalist and governor of the African Republic of Maryland (b. 1799)
 June 10 – Robert Dundas, 2nd Viscount Melville, British politician (b. 1771)

July–December 

 July 10 – Louis Daguerre, French artist, chemist (b. 1787)
 July 17 – Roger Sheaffe, British general (b. 1763)
 August 8 – James Broadwood, English piano manufacturer (b. 1772)
 August 24 – James McDowell, American politician (b. 1795)
 September 10 – Thomas Hopkins Gallaudet, American educator (b. 1787)
 September 11 – Sylvester Graham, American nutritionist, inventor (b. 1794)
 September 14 – James Fenimore Cooper, American writer (b. 1789)
 October 4 – Manuel Godoy, Spanish statesman (b. 1767)
 October 19 – Madame Royale Marie Thérèse of France (b. 1778)
 October 25 – Giorgio Pullicino, Maltese painter, and architect (b. 1779)
 October 31 – Petar II Petrović-Njegoš, Montenegrin statesman, religious leader and poet (b. 1813)
 November 26 – Jean-de-Dieu Soult, French marshal, politician (b. 1769)
 December 19
 J. M. W. Turner, English artist (b. 1775)
 Karl Drais, German inventor (b. 1785)

Date unknown 
 Gustafva Lindskog, Swedish athlete (b. 1794)

References